The 2017–18 Chicago Bulls season was the 52nd season of the franchise in the National Basketball Association (NBA). For the first time since 2011, All-Star Jimmy Butler was not on the roster as he was traded to the Minnesota Timberwolves in the off-season. On February 1, 2018, months after his confrontation with teammate Bobby Portis, Nikola Mirotić agreed to a trade where he'd be sent alongside a future second round pick to the New Orleans Pelicans in exchange for Ömer Aşık, Tony Allen, Jameer Nelson, and a future first round pick. The Bulls had their first losing season since 2008, and their first 50-loss season since 2004.

Newly acquired Zach LaVine played in just 24 games this season due to knee injuries.

Draft picks

Entering draft night, the Bulls possessed picks 16 and 38, with the latter being acquired via a trade with the Cleveland Cavaliers. Exiting draft night, they left with only one draft pick that wasn't even originally theirs to begin with. First, they traded away All-Star shooting guard Jimmy Butler and their #16 pick (which became redshirted freshman center Justin Patton from Creighton University), to the Minnesota Timberwolves for Zach LaVine, Kris Dunn, and the Timberwolves' #7 pick in the draft, which became the star Finnish freshman center/power forward Lauri Markkanen from the University of Arizona. As for their own second-round selection on the day of the draft, one that the Bulls got from Cleveland, they traded away that pick (which was junior power forward Jordan Bell from the University of Oregon) to the defending champion Golden State Warriors in exchange for $3.5 million.

Roster

Standings

Division

Conference

Game log

Preseason

|- style="background:#cfc;"
| 1
| October 3
| @ New Orleans
| 
| Cristiano Felicio (15)
| Mirotic, Portis (9)
| Jerian Grant (9)
| Smoothie King Center16,962
| 1–0
|- style="background:#fcc;"
| 2
| October 4
| @ Dallas
| 
| Lopez, Zipser (12)
| Justin Holiday (6)
| Kris Dunn (6)
| American Airlines Center17,091
| 1–1
|- style="background:#cfc;"
| 3
| October 6
| Milwaukee
| 
| Justin Holiday (21)
| Bobby Portis (10)
| Arcidiacono, Grant, Portis, Valentine (4)
| United Center17,187
| 2–1
|- style="background:#fcc;"
| 4
| October 8
| New Orleans
| 
| Denzel Valentine (15)
| Bobby Portis (10)
| Ryan Arcidiacono (6)
| United Center17,523
| 2–2
|- style="background:#cfc;"
| 5
| October 10
| @ Cleveland
| 
| Justin Holiday (28)
| Justin Holiday (11)
| Jerian Grant (5)
| Quicken Loans Arena19,042
| 3–2
|- style="background:#fcc;"
| 6
| October 13
| Toronto
| 
| Justin Holiday (17)
| Jerian Grant (9)
| Jerian Grant (8)
| United Center19,677
| 3–3

Regular season

|- style="background:#fcc
| 1
| October 19
| @ Toronto
| 
| Robin Lopez (18)
| Lopez, Markkanen (8)
| Jerian Grant (7)
| Air Canada Centre19,800
| 0–1
|- style="background:#fcc
| 2
| October 21
| San Antonio
| 
| Robin Lopez (16)
| Lauri Markkanen (12)
| Jerian Grant (5)
| United Center21,640
| 0–2
|- style="background:#fcc
| 3
| October 24
| @ Cleveland
| 
| Justin Holiday (25)
| Lauri Markkanen (8)
| Jerian Grant (10)
| Quicken Loans Arena20,562
| 0–3
|- style="background:#cfc
| 4
| October 26
| Atlanta
| 
| Robin Lopez (16)
| Lauri Markkanen (13)
| Jerian Grant (7)
| United Center21,104
| 1–3
|- style="background:#fcc
| 5
| October 28
| Oklahoma City
| 
| Lauri Markkanen (15)
| Felicio, Markkanen (8)
| Jerian Grant (4)
| United Center21,706
| 1–4

|- style="background:#fcc
| 6
| November 1
| @ Miami
| 
| Lauri Markkanen (25)
| David Nwaba (11)
| Jerian Grant (8)
| American Airlines Arena19,600
| 1–5
|- style="background:#cfc
| 7
| November 3
| @ Orlando
| 
| Justin Holiday (19)
| Robin Lopez (10)
| Jerian Grant (6)
| Amway Center19,171
| 2–5
|- style="background:#fcc
| 8
| November 4
| New Orleans
| 
| Justin Holiday (18)
| Robin Lopez (9)
| Jerian Grant (9)
| United Center21,254
| 2–6
|- style="background:#fcc
| 9
| November 7
| @ Toronto
| 
| Bobby Portis (21)
| Bobby Portis (13)
| Jerian Grant (5)
| Air Canada Centre19,800
| 2–7
|- style="background:#fcc
| 10
| November 10
| Indiana
| 
| Bobby Portis (20)
| Bobby Portis (11)
| Kris Dunn (5)
| United Center22,416
| 2–8
|- style="background:#fcc
| 11
| November 11
| @ San Antonio
| 
| Lopez, Portis (17)
| Bobby Portis (6)
| Jerian Grant (8)
| AT&T Center18,418
| 2–9
|- style="background:#fcc
| 12
| November 15
| @ Oklahoma City
| 
| Blakeney, Markkanen (16)
| Bobby Portis (9)
| Dunn, Grant (3)
| Chesapeake Energy Arena18,203
| 2–10
|- style="background:#cfc
| 13
| November 17
| Charlotte
| 
| Justin Holiday (27)
| Lauri Markkanen (7)
| Kris Dunn (7)
| United Center20,493
| 3–10
|- style="background:#fcc
| 14
| November 19
| @ Phoenix
| 
| Lauri Markkanen (26)
| Lauri Markkanen (13)
| Kris Dunn (6)
| Talking Stick Resort Arena16,264
| 3–11
|- style="background:#fcc
| 15
| November 21
| @ LA Lakers
| 
| Denzel Valentine (17)
| Lauri Markkanen (14)
| Kris Dunn (6)
| Staples Center18,997
| 3–12
|- style="background:#fcc
| 16
| November 22
| @ Utah
| 
| Robin Lopez (15)
| Kris Dunn (9)
| Grant, Valentine (4)
| Vivint Smart Home Arena17,434
| 3–13
|- style="background:#fcc
| 17
| November 24
| @ Golden State
| 
| Jerian Grant (21)
| Bobby Portis (8)
| Kris Dunn (4)
| Oracle Arena19,596
| 3–14
|- style="background:#fcc
| 18
| November 26
| Miami
| 
| Jerian Grant (24)
| Denzel Valentine (13)
| Denzel Valentine (7)
| United Center20,928
| 3–15
|- style="background:#fcc
| 19
| November 28
| Phoenix
| 
| Justin Holiday (25)
| Robin Lopez (7)
| Kris Dunn (8)
| United Center18,324
| 3–16
|- style="background:#fcc
| 20
| November 30
| @ Denver
| 
| Lopez, Markkanen (20)
| Lauri Markkanen (9)
| Jerian Grant (7)
| Pepsi Center15,156
| 3–17

|- style="background:#fcc
| 21
| December 1
| Sacramento
| 
| Jerian Grant (17)
| David Nwaba (9)
| Kris Dunn (8)
| United Center19,268
| 3–18
|- style="background:#fcc
| 22
| December 4
| Cleveland
| 
| Kris Dunn (15)
| Bobby Portis (9)
| Kris Dunn (5)
| United Center21,323
| 3–19
|- style="background:#fcc
| 23
| December 6
| @ Indiana
| 
| Kris Dunn (18)
| Denzel Valentine (8)
| Kris Dunn (6)
| Bankers Life Fieldhouse13,013
| 3–20
|- style="background:#cfc
| 24
| December 8
| @ Charlotte
| 
| Lauri Markkanen (24)
| Lauri Markkanen (12)
| Kris Dunn (12)
| Spectrum Center14,077
| 4–20
|- style="background:#cfc
| 25
| December 9
| NY Knicks
| 
| Nikola Mirotic (19)
| Lauri Markkanen (8)
| Jerian Grant (9)
| United Center20,149
| 5–20
|- style="background:#cfc
| 26
| December 11
| Boston
| 
| Nikola Mirotic (24)
| Nikola Mirotic (8)
| Jerian Grant (9)
| United Center19,617
| 6–20
|- style="background:#cfc
| 27
| December 13
| Utah
| 
| Nikola Mirotic (29)
| Nikola Mirotic (9)
| Kris Dunn (8)
| United Center18,102
| 7–20
|- style="background:#cfc
| 28
| December 15
| @ Milwaukee
| 
| Bobby Portis (27)
| Bobby Portis (12)
| Dunn, Holiday (7)
| Bradley Center16,921
| 8–20
|- style="background:#cfc
| 29
| December 18
| Philadelphia
| 
| Dunn, Mirotic (22)
| Nikola Mirotic (13)
| Kris Dunn (6)
| United Center20,796
| 9–20
|- style="background:#cfc
| 30
| December 20
| Orlando
| 
| Denzel Valentine (15)
| Denzel Valentine (10)
| Kris Dunn (7)
| United Center20,285
| 10–20
|- style="background:#fcc
| 31
| December 21
| @ Cleveland
| 
| Lauri Markkanen (25)
| Justin Holiday (7)
| Kris Dunn (14)
| Quicken Loans Arena20,562
| 10–21
|- style="background:#fcc
| 32
| December 23
| @ Boston
| 
| Bobby Portis (17)
| Nikola Mirotic (9)
| Kris Dunn (7)
| TD Garden18,624
| 10–22
|- style="background:#cfc
| 33
| December 26
| @ Milwaukee
| 
| Nikola Mirotic (24)
| David Nwaba (9)
| Kris Dunn (12)
| Bradley Center18,717
| 11–22
|- style="background:#cfc
| 34
| December 27
| NY Knicks
| 
| Kris Dunn (17)
| Denzel Valentine (9)
| Jerian Grant (6)
| United Center21,883
| 12–22
|- style="background:#cfc
| 35
| December 29
| Indiana
| 
| Lauri Markkanen (32)
| Portis, Grant, Markkanen (7)
| Jerian Grant (12)
| United Center21,178
| 13–22
|- style="background:#fcc"
| 36
| December 31
| @ Washington
| 
| Nikola Mirotic (21)
| Lauri Markkanen (9)
| Kris Dunn (11)
| Capital One Arena20,356
| 13–23

|- style="background:#fcc"
| 37
| January 1
| Portland
| 
| Kris Dunn (22)
| Nikola Mirotic (10)
| Denzel Valentine (6)
| United Center20,860
| 13–24
|- style="background:#fcc"
| 38
| January 3
| Toronto
| 
| Justin Holiday (26)
| Lauri Markkanen (12)
| Kris Dunn (8)
| United Center20,056
| 13–25
|- style="background:#cfc"
| 39
| January 5
| @ Dallas
| 
| Kris Dunn (32)
| Nikola Mirotic (10)
| Kris Dunn (9)
| American Airlines Center20,073
| 14–25
|- style="background:#fcc"
| 40
| January 6
| @ Indiana
| 
| Bobby Portis (15)
| Markkanen, Valentine (5)
| Kris Dunn (8)
| Bankers Life Fieldhouse17,923
| 14–26
|- style="background:#fcc"
| 41
| January 8
| Houston
| 
| Bobby Portis (22)
| Markkanen, Valentine (8)
| Kris Dunn (8)
| United Center17,462
| 14–27
|- style="background:#cfc"
| 42
| January 10
| @ NY Knicks
| 
| Lauri Markkanen (33)
| Lauri Markkanen (10)
| Kris Dunn (8)
| Madison Square Garden19,812
| 15–27
|- style="background:#cfc"
| 43
| January 13
| Detroit
| 
| Lauri Markkanen (19)
| Kris Dunn (8)
| Kris Dunn (8)
| United Center21,613
| 16–27
|- style="background:#cfc"
| 44
| January 15
| Miami
| 
| Justin Holiday (25)
| Lauri Markkanen (9)
| Kris Dunn (10)
| United Center20,546
| 17–27
|- style="background:#fcc"
| 45
| January 17
| Golden State
| 
| Nikola Mirotic (24)
| Lauri Markkanen (8)
| Denzel Valentine (7)
| United Center21,372
| 17–28
|- style="background:#cfc"
| 46
| January 20
| @ Atlanta
| 
| Robin Lopez (20)
| Zach LaVine (9)
| Jerian Grant (6)
| Philips Arena15,597
| 18–28
|- style="background:#fcc"
| 47
| January 22
| @ New Orleans
| 
| Grant, Lopez (22)
| Lauri Markkanen (17)
| Jerian Grant (13)
| Smoothie King Center17,101
| 18–29
|- style="background:#fcc"
| 48
| January 24
| @ Philadelphia
| 
| Bobby Portis (22)
| Bobby Portis (11)
| David Nwaba (4)
| Wells Fargo Center20,547
| 18–30
|- style="background:#fcc"
| 49
| January 26
| LA Lakers
| 
| Nikola Mirotic (18)
| Markkanen, Valentine (11)
| Jerian Grant (8)
| United Center21,827
| 18–31
|- style="background:#fcc"
| 50
| January 28
| Milwaukee
| 
| Denzel Valentine (18)
| Lauri Markkanen (10)
| Grant, LaVine (4)
| United Center21,630
| 18–32
|- style="background:#fcc"
| 51
| January 31
| @ Portland
| 
| Zach LaVine (23)
| Bobby Portis (10)
| Grant, Felicio (3)
| Moda Center19,000
| 18–33

|- style="background:#fcc"
| 52
| February 3
| @ LA Clippers
| 
| Zach LaVine (21)
| Bobby Portis (13)
| Grant, LaVine (4)
| Staples Center19,068
| 18–34
|- style="background:#fcc"
| 53
| February 5
| @ Sacramento
| 
| Zach LaVine (27)
| Bobby Portis (14)
| Jerian Grant (5)
| Golden 1 Center17,583
| 18–35
|- style="background:#cfc"
| 54
| February 9
| Minnesota
| 
| Zach LaVine (35)
| Jerian Grant (8)
| Jerian Grant (11)
| United Center21,558
| 19–35
|- style="background:#fcc"
| 55
| February 10
| Washington
| 
| Justin Holiday (15)
| Markkanen, Valentine (10)
| Jerian Grant (8)
| United Center21,112
| 19–36
|- style="background:#cfc"
| 56
| February 12
| Orlando
| 
| Lauri Markkanen (21)
| Lauri Markkanen (8)
| Jerian Grant (7)
| United Center18,611
| 20–36
|- style="background:#fcc"
| 57
| February 14
| Toronto
| 
| Bobby Portis (18)
| Markkanen, Nwaba (6)
| Jerian Grant (7)
| United Center21,006
| 20–37
|- style="background:#fcc"
| 58
| February 22
| Philadelphia
| 
| Bobby Portis (38)
| David Nwaba (9)
| Cameron Payne (7)
| United Center21,312
| 20–38
|- style="background:#fcc"
| 59
| February 24
| @ Minnesota
| 
| Zach LaVine (21)
| David Nwaba (9)
| Zach LaVine (7)
| Target Center18,978
| 20–39
|- style="background:#fcc"
| 60
| February 26
| @ Brooklyn
| 
| Kris Dunn (23)
| Denzel Valentine (13)
| Kris Dunn (4)
| Barclays Center15,081
| 20–40
|- style="background:#fcc"
| 61
| February 27
| @ Charlotte
| 
| Zach LaVine (21)
| Bobby Portis (10)
| Cameron Payne (6)
| Spectrum Center14,521
| 20–41

|- style="background:#cfc"
| 62
| March 2
| Dallas
| 
| Bobby Portis (22)
| Lauri Markkanen (12)
| Kris Dunn (7)
| United Center21,017
| 21–41
|- style="background:#fcc"
| 63
| March 5
| Boston
| 
| Denzel Valentine (20)
| Noah Vonleh (9)
| Kris Dunn (4)
| United Center21,286
| 21–42
|- style="background:#cfc"
| 64
| March 7
| Memphis
| 
| Lauri Markkanen (22)
| Bobby Portis (10)
| Kris Dunn (9)
| United Center20,210
| 22–42
|- style="background:#fcc"
| 65
| March 9
| @ Detroit
| 
| Cameron Payne (17)
| Lauri Markkanen (8)
| Bobby Portis (5)
| Little Caesars Arena17,406
| 22–43
|- style="background:#cfc"
| 66
| March 11
| @ Atlanta
| 
| LaVine, Portis (21)
| Bobby Portis (10)
| Denzel Valentine (7)
| Philips Arena15,266
| 23–43
|- style="background:#fcc"
| 67
| March 13
| LA Clippers
| 
| Bobby Portis (19)
| Bobby Portis (9)
| Kris Dunn (6)
| United Center20,912
| 23–44
|- style="background:#cfc"
| 68
| March 15
| @ Memphis
| 
| Zach LaVine (20)
| Noah Vonleh (10)
| Cameron Payne (5)
| FedExForum16,511
| 24–44
|- style="background:#fcc"
| 69
| March 17
| Cleveland
| 
| Denzel Valentine (34)
| Cristiano Felicio (10)
| Cameron Payne (10)
| United Center22,983
| 24–45
|- style="background:#fcc"
| 70
| March 19
| @ NY Knicks
| 
| Cristiano Felicio (17)
| Noah Vonleh (12)
| Cameron Payne (6)
| Madison Square Garden18,835
| 24–46
|- style="background:#fcc"
| 71
| March 21
| Denver
| 
| Cristiano Felicio (16)
| Bobby Portis (8)
| Jerian Grant (7)
| United Center20,671
| 24–47
|- style="background:#fcc"
| 72
| March 23
| Milwaukee
| 
| Denzel Valentine (20)
| Cristiano Felicio (11)
| Cameron Payne (6)
| United Center21,698
| 24–48
|- style="background:#fcc"
| 73
| March 24
| @ Detroit
| 
| Denzel Valentine (18)
| Cristiano Felicio (9)
| Jerian Grant (10)
| Little Caesars Arena19,139
| 24–49
|- style="background:#fcc"
| 74
| March 27
| @ Houston
| 
| Lauri Markkanen (22)
| Noah Vonleh (13)
| Grant, Payne, Valentine, Vonleh (3)
| Toyota Center18,055
| 24–50
|- style="background:#fcc"
| 75
| March 29
| @ Miami
| 
| David Nwaba (15)
| Noah Vonleh (13)
| Cameron Payne (5)
| American Airlines Arena19,746
| 24–51
|- style="background:#cfc"
| 76
| March 30
| @ Orlando
| 
| Kilpatrick, Markkanen (13)
| Cristiano Felicio (16)
| Cameron Payne (6)
| Amway Center18,918
| 25–51

|- style="background:#cfc"
| 77
| April 1
| Washington
| 
| Lauri Markkanen (23)
| Cristiano Felicio (8)
| Jerian Grant (7)
| United Center20,466
| 26–51
|- style="background:#cfc"
| 78
| April 3
| Charlotte
| 
| Lauri Markkanen (24)
| David Nwaba (9)
| Cameron Payne (7)
| United Center20,139
| 27–51
|- style="background:#fcc"
| 79
| April 6
| @ Boston
| 
| Sean Kilpatrick (24)
| Cristiano Felicio (9)
| Jerian Grant (8)
| TD Garden18,624
| 27–52
|- style="background:#fcc"
| 80
| April 7
| Brooklyn
| 
| Sean Kilpatrick (20)
| Cristiano Felicio (9)
| Cameron Payne (5)
| United Center21,669
| 27–53
|- style="background:#fcc"
| 81
| April 9
| @ Brooklyn
| 
| Sean Kilpatrick (16)
| David Nwaba (10)
| Cameron Payne (6)
| Barclays Center16,187
| 27–54
|- style="background:#fcc"
| 82
| April 11
| Detroit
| 
| Lauri Markkanen (20)
| Markkanen, Portis (8)
| Cameron Payne (9)
| United Center21,342
| 27–55

Injuries/Personal games missed

Transactions

Trades

Free agency

Re-signed

Additions

Subtractions

References

2017-18
2017–18 NBA season by team
2018 in sports in Illinois
2017 in sports in Illinois
2010s in Chicago
2017 in Illinois
Bulls